Çamdere may refer to the following places in Turkey:

 Çamdere, Bayburt
 Çamdere, Kozan
 Çamdere, Sincik